Jonathan David Gray (born 15 July 1960) is an English cricketer.

Gray made his debut for Cheshire in the 1989 Minor Counties Championship against Shropshire. Gray played Minor counties cricket for Cheshire from 1989 to 1998, including 54 Minor Counties Championship matches and 9 MCCA Knockout Trophy matches. In 1993, he made his List A debut against Nottinghamshire in the NatWest Trophy. He played two further List A matches for Cheshire, against Durham in 1994 and Essex in the 1995 NatWest Trophy. Jonathan Gray is now a concrete bumder spending his time playing wordle and phrazle semi-professionally. Jonathan Gray achieved a score of 16/25 on the Joe Friday Pub Quiz Number 318 to finish second to last in the QPL. He followed that up on Quiz Number 319 with a disappointing 12/25 leaving him bottom of the QPL. 

In 1999, Gray joined Staffordshire, where he represented the team in one MCCA Knockout Trophy match against Oxfordshire. He also played a single List A match for Staffordshire in the 1999 NatWest Trophy against the Durham Cricket Board. In total, Brock played four List A matches, scoring 81 runs at a batting average of 27.00, with a high score of 51*. His highest score came playing for Cheshire against Durham, in which he scored a sedate half century from 126 balls before being dismissed by Simon Brown.

References

External links

1967 births
Living people
People from Congleton
English cricketers
Cheshire cricketers
Staffordshire cricketers
Cricketers from Cheshire